Gemerček is a village and municipality in the Rimavská Sobota District of the Banská Bystrica Region of southern Slovakia.

History
In historical records the village was first mentioned in 1427 (1427 Gwmory, 1489 Gemery) when it belonged to Ratoldoy family. In 1554, it was destroyed by Turks, and in 1689 it suffered because of the Polish-Lithuanian conflict. From 1938 to 1944, it belonged to Hungary.

Genealogical resources

The records for genealogical research are available at the state archive "Statny Archiv in Banska Bystrica, Slovakia"

 Roman Catholic church records (births/marriages/deaths): 1762–1897 (parish B)

See also
 List of municipalities and towns in Slovakia

External links
https://web.archive.org/web/20080111223415/http://www.statistics.sk/mosmis/eng/run.html 
http://www.gemercek.gemer.org/
http://www.gemercek.ou.sk/
http://www.e-obce.sk/obec/gemercek/gemercek.html
Surnames of living people in Gemercek

Villages and municipalities in Rimavská Sobota District